Jerry "Ice" Reynolds (born December 23, 1962) is an American former professional basketball player who was selected by the Milwaukee Bucks in the first round (22nd overall) of the 1985 NBA Draft. A 6'8" guard-forward from Louisiana State University (LSU) and Madison Area Technical College, Reynolds played in eight NBA seasons from 1985–92 until 1995–96. He played for the Bucks, Seattle SuperSonics and Orlando Magic. His best year as a pro came during the 1989–90 season as a member of the Magic, appearing in 67 games and averaging 12.8 points, 4.8 rebounds, and 1.39 steals per game.

Reynolds is credited with being the first person noted to have used the term "24/7", when he described his jump shot as being "good 24 hours a day, seven days a week, 365 days a year".

Reynolds was also the beneficiary of Scott Skiles' record-breaking 30th assist on December 30, 1990 against the Denver Nuggets.

Career statistics

NBA

Regular season

|-
| align="left" | 1985–86
| align="left" | Milwaukee
| 55 || 8 || 9.2 || .444 || .500 || .558 || 1.5 || 1.6 || 0.8 || 0.3 || 3.7
|-
| align="left" | 1986–87
| align="left" | Milwaukee
| 58 || 24 || 16.6 || .393 || .333 || .641 || 3.0 || 1.8 || 0.9 || 0.5 || 7.0
|-
| align="left" | 1987–88
| align="left" | Milwaukee
| 62 || 21 || 18.7 || .449 || .429 || .773 || 2.6 || 1.7 || 1.2 || 0.5 || 8.0
|-
| align="left" | 1988–89
| align="left" | Seattle
| 56 || 0 || 13.2 || .417 || .200 || .760 || 1.8 || 1.1 || 0.9 || 0.5 || 7.6
|-
| align="left" | 1989–90
| align="left" | Orlando
| 67 || 40 || 27.1 || .417 || .071 || .742 || 4.8 || 2.7 || 1.4 || 1.0 || 12.8
|-
| align="left" | 1990–91
| align="left" | Orlando
| 80 || 9 || 23.0 || .434 || .294 || .802 || 3.7 || 2.5 || 1.2 || 0.7 || 12.9
|-
| align="left" | 1991–92
| align="left" | Orlando
| 46 || 16 || 25.2 || .380 || .125 || .836 || 3.2 || 3.3 || 1.4 || 0.4 || 12.1
|-
| align="left" | 1995–96
| align="left" | Milwaukee
| 19 || 0 || 10.1 || .396 || .100 || .619 || 1.7 || 0.6 || 0.8 || 0.3 || 2.9
|- class="sortbottom"
| style="text-align:center;" colspan="2"| Career
| 443 || 118 || 18.9 || .418 || .226 || .749 || 3.0 || 2.0 || 1.1 || 0.6 || 9.1
|}

Playoffs

|-
| align="left" | 1985–86
| align="left" | Milwaukee
| 7 || 0 || 5.7 || .412 || .000 || .545 || 1.3 || 0.6 || 0.6 || 0.4 || 2.9
|-
| align="left" | 1986–87
| align="left" | Milwaukee
| 4 || 0 || 1.3 || .333 || .000 || .500 || 0.3 || 0.5 || 0.8 || 0.0 || 0.8
|-
| align="left" | 1987–88
| align="left" | Milwaukee
| 3 || 0 || 4.0 || .667 || .000 || .000 || 0.3 || 0.3 || 0.0 || 0.0 || 2.7
|-
| align="left" | 1988–89
| align="left" | Seattle
| 4 || 0 || 10.0 || .318 || .250 || .700 || 1.3 || 0.3 || 0.5 || 1.5 || 5.5
|- class="sortbottom"
| style="text-align:center;" colspan="2"| Career
| 18 || 0 || 5.4 || .396 || .167 || .609 || 0.9 || 0.4 || 0.5 || 0.5 || 2.9
|}

College

|-
| align="left" | 1982–83
| align="left" | LSU
| 32 || - || 27.8 || .534 || - || .620 || 6.2 || 1.9 || 2.0 || 0.8 || 10.6
|-
| align="left" | 1983–84
| align="left" | LSU
| 29 || 28 || 31.0 || .528 || - || .538 || 8.2 || 1.6 || 2.8 || 0.6 || 14.2
|-
| align="left" | 1984–85
| align="left" | LSU
| 29 || - || 27.7 || .502 || - || .598 || 6.1 || 3.6 || 1.7 || 0.4 || 11.0
|- class="sortbottom"
| style="text-align:center;" colspan="2"| Career
| 90 || 28 || 28.8 || .521 || - || .582 || 6.8 || 2.3 || 2.2 || 0.6 || 11.9
|}

References

External links 
 NBA stats @ basketballreference.com
College Stats

1962 births
Living people
African-American basketball players
American expatriate basketball people in Cyprus
American expatriate basketball people in Italy
American men's basketball players
Basketball players from New York City
Connecticut Pride players
LSU Tigers basketball players
Mens Sana Basket players
Milwaukee Bucks draft picks
Milwaukee Bucks players
Orlando Magic expansion draft picks
Orlando Magic players
Pallacanestro Cantù players
Seattle SuperSonics players
Shooting guards
Small forwards
Sportspeople from Brooklyn
United States Basketball League players
21st-century African-American people
20th-century African-American sportspeople